The 1988 United States House of Representatives elections in South Carolina were held on November 8, 1988 to select six Representatives for two-year terms from the state of South Carolina.  The primary elections for the Democrats and the Republicans were held on June 14.  All six incumbents were re-elected and the composition of the state delegation remained four Democrats and two Republicans.

1st congressional district
Incumbent Republican Congressman Arthur Ravenel, Jr. of the 1st congressional district, in office since 1987, defeated Democratic challenger Wheeler Tillman.

General election results

|-
| 
| colspan=5 |Republican hold
|-

2nd congressional district
Incumbent Republican Congressman Floyd Spence of the 2nd congressional district, in office since 1971, defeated Democratic challenger Jim Leventis.

General election results

|-
| 
| colspan=5 |Republican hold
|-

3rd congressional district
Incumbent Democratic Congressman Butler Derrick of the 3rd congressional district, in office since 1975, defeated Republican challenger Henry Jordan.

General election results

|-
| 
| colspan=5 |Democratic hold
|-

4th congressional district
Incumbent Democratic Congresswoman Liz J. Patterson of the 4th congressional district, in office since 1987, defeated Republican challenger Knox White.

Republican primary

General election results

|-
| 
| colspan=5 |Democratic hold
|-

5th congressional district
Incumbent Democratic Congressman John M. Spratt, Jr. of the 5th congressional district, in office since 1983, defeated Republican challenger Robert K. Carley.

General election results

|-
| 
| colspan=5 |Democratic hold
|-

6th congressional district
Incumbent Democratic Congressman Robin Tallon of the 6th congressional district, in office since 1983, defeated Republican challenger Bob Cunningham.

Democratic primary

Republican primary

General election results

|-
| 
| colspan=5 |Democratic hold
|-

See also
United States House of Representatives elections, 1988
South Carolina's congressional districts

References

1988 South Carolina elections
1988
South Carolina